Mammaliicoccus sciuri, previously Staphylococcus sciuri, is a Gram-positive, oxidase-positive, coagulase-negative member of the bacterial genus Mammaliicoccus consisting of clustered cocci. The type subspecies M. sciuri subsp. sciuri was originally known as Staphylococcus sciuri subsp. sciuri and used to categorize 35 strains shown to use cellobiose, galactose, sucrose, and glycerol.

In 2020, Madhaiyan et al. renamed the genus for M. sciuri from Staphylococcus to Mammaliicoccus.

References

Further reading

External links
Type strain of Staphylococcus sciuri at BacDive -  the Bacterial Diversity Metadatabase

sciuri
Bacteria described in 1976